Johan Anders Andersson (born May 18, 1984) is a Swedish professional ice hockey forward. He is currently playing for IF Troja/Ljungby of HockeyAllsvenskan.

Career 
Andersson was born in Motala but grew up in Ljungby. His professional career began with the HockeyAllsvenskan team IF Troja/Ljungby, his youth team, in the 2000–01 season. Showing great offensive skills, he was drafted in the 2003 NHL Entry Draft by the Chicago Blackhawks in the sixth round as 181st overall. He was then elected to the Swedish national junior team for the 2004 World Junior Ice Hockey Championships.

In the 2004–05 season he made his first appearance in the top Swedish league, Elitserien (SEL), with the Linköpings HC. Statistically he didn't impress, and after two seasons with Linköping he signed with Timrå IK prior to the 2006–07 season. With major improvements, he scored 9 goals and 25 points in the 2006–07 season. On April 9, 2009 he left Timrå and signed for Färjestad BK. In April 2010 he returned to Linköpings HC. He left Linköping after one year, returning to Timrå IK prior to the 2011–12 season.

Career statistics

Regular season and playoffs

International

References

External links

1984 births
Chicago Blackhawks draft picks
Färjestad BK players
IF Troja/Ljungby players
Linköping HC players
Living people
People from Motala Municipality
Swedish ice hockey centres
Timrå IK players
Sportspeople from Östergötland County